ORP Wicher (meaning "gale") was a name of two destroyers of the Polish Navy:

  commissioned in 1930 and sunk during the Invasion of Poland in 1939
  commissioned from the Soviet Union in 1958 and scrapped in 1974

Polish Navy ship names